Alexander Plaisted Saxton (July 16, 1919 – August 20, 2012) was an American historian, novelist, and university professor. He was the author of the pioneering Indispensable Enemy (1975), one of the founding texts in Asian American studies.

Life and works
Saxton was born in Great Barrington, Massachusetts to Eugene and Martha Saxton, one of two children. His older brother was the author Mark Saxton (1914–1988). His father became the editor in chief of Harper & Brothers, his mother taught literature at a private girls' school in Manhattan. Saxton was raised on the East Side of Manhattan, his parents were known to have famous writers over for dinner such as Thornton Wilder and Aldous Huxley. He attended Phillips Exeter Academy and Harvard (John F. Kennedy was a classmate), but dropped out in his junior year to become a laborer in Chicago. He said he wanted to see "how people live in the other America — the real America."

After dropping out of Harvard, Saxton made the intentional transition from a privileged upbringing to the working class where he labored at various times as "a harvest hand, construction gang laborer, engine-wiper, freight brakeman, architectural apprentice, assistant to the assistant editor" of a union newspaper, railroad switchman and columnist for The Daily Worker. Saxton published his first novel, Grand Crossing in 1943, when he was 24 years old. His next novel was his most acclaimed, The Great Midland published in 1948. It examines the 1920s and 1930s labor movement through the lives of a man and a woman. His last novel, Bright Web in the Darkness (1958), is about two women - one white, the other black - who meet in a factory during World War II. Saxton never returned to the novel, two years before his death he said "The novel claims only a brief span in human culture and may not continue to play a key role."

While working on the novels, Saxton was a full-time organizer of maritime workers and longshoremen in San Francisco, and he also wrote prolifically for many left-wing publications. Saxton did eventually get his bachelor's degree from the University of Chicago, mainly to appease his parents. During World War II he served with the Merchant Marines. After the war, due to his left-leaning activities and with the Cold War in full swing, he found it difficult to find publishers for his fiction. At the age of 43 he returned to school, earning a Ph.D. in history from the University of California, Berkeley and soon became a professor at the University of California, Los Angeles. He said he was part of a generation "radicalized by the Great Depression," going on to say:
This was a group relatively small in numbers but impressively influential in its time. Whether organizing unions, advocating for civil rights or fighting fascism in Spain, all shared an urgent sense that the time had come in human history for crossing from an ethics of individual achievement, to one of moral responsibility for the social order one lived in. 

Saxton was one of the founding fathers of the UCLA Asian American Studies Center and the creator of new courses in American history, including the first course on Filipino-American history and another on Film and History. He was the author of the pioneering, Indispensable Enemy (1975), one of the founding texts in Asian American history/studies. As Claire Potter wrote in The Chronicle of Higher Education soon after his death:

He was one of the first historians to think seriously about how racial whiteness coalesced as an identity for European-descended working-class men in California; and how the demonization of immigrants from the Asian diaspora by nativist elites served the politics of capitalism in the Western United States.

Saxton taught American history at UCLA from 1968 until his retirement in 1990. Saxton had two daughters, one who died in 1990 and another who died of cancer in April 2019. His wife Trudy died in about 2002. Saxton's death was by a self-inflicted gunshot wound at his home in Lone Pine, California on August 20, 2012. His daughter said her father wished to choose the time and place of his death, like other transitions in his life.

Bibliography
2006 Religion and the Human Prospect
2003 The Rise and Fall of the White Republic: Class Politics and Mass Culture in Nineteenth Century America
1975 The Indispensable Enemy: Labor and the Anti-Chinese Movement in California
1958 Bright Web in the Darkness (novel)
1948 The Great Midland (novel)
1943 Grand Crossing (novel)

References

External links
"The Indispensable Enemy and Ideological Construction: Reminiscences of an Octogenarian Radical", essay by Saxton reflecting upon his life and career. From Amerasia Journal 26:1 "Histories and Historians in the Making" (2000).

1919 births
2012 suicides
University of California, Los Angeles faculty
University of Chicago alumni
University of California, Berkeley alumni
Phillips Exeter Academy alumni
Suicides by firearm in California
20th-century American novelists
American male novelists
20th-century American historians
American trade union leaders
American socialists
People from Great Barrington, Massachusetts
Novelists from Massachusetts
Activists from California
20th-century American male writers
American male non-fiction writers
Historians from Massachusetts
Historians from California
United States Merchant Mariners of World War II